Barakhayevka is a rural locality (a village) in Askinsky Selsoviet, Askinsky District, Bashkortostan, Russia. The population was 124 as of 2010. There are 3  streets.

Geography 
Barakhayevka is located 7 km north of Askino (the district's administrative centre) by road. Askino is the nearest rural locality.

References 

Rural localities in Askinsky District